The National Geomagnetism Program is a program directed by the USGS that monitors the Earth's magnetic field.

External links
Official site

United States Geological Survey
Geomagnetism